Uxbridge station may refer to:
Uxbridge tube station, a metro station in Uxbridge, London
Uxbridge Road tube station, a former metro station in London
Uxbridge Vine Street railway station, a former railway station in Uxbridge, London
Uxbridge High Street railway station, a former railway station in Uxbridge, London
Uxbridge railway station (Ontario), a former railway station in Ontario, Canada
Uxbridge station (Massachusetts), a former railway station in Massachusetts, United States